Ectinogonia is a genus of beetles in the family Buprestidae, containing the following species:

 Ectinogonia angulicollis (Fairmaire & Germain, 1858)
 Ectinogonia atacamensis Moore, 1994
 Ectinogonia auroguttata Burmeister, 1872
 Ectinogonia buquetii (Spinola, 1837)
 Ectinogonia cariosa Nonfried, 1894
 Ectinogonia carrascoi Moore, 1994
 Ectinogonia catenulata Kerremans, 1919
 Ectinogonia chalyboeiventris Germain & Kerremans, 1906
 Ectinogonia costata (Fairmaire, 1867)
 Ectinogonia darwini Waterhouse, 1913
 Ectinogonia fastidiosa (Fairmaire & Germain, 1864)
 Ectinogonia intermedia Kerremans, 1903
 Ectinogonia isamarae Moore, 1994
 Ectinogonia melichari Obenberger, 1923
 Ectinogonia minor Olave, 1936
 Ectinogonia pretiosa (Philippi, 1859)
 Ectinogonia pulverea Kerremans, 1919
 Ectinogonia pusilla Moore, 1994
 Ectinogonia roitmani Moore, 1994
 Ectinogonia speciosa (Germain, 1856)

References

Buprestidae genera